Marcel Wilke (born June 26, 1989) is a German footballer who currently plays for FC Bayern Alzenau.

External links

1989 births
Living people
German footballers
Chemnitzer FC players
Kickers Offenbach players
3. Liga players
Association football midfielders
People from Plauen
Footballers from Saxony